Mohammad Manar Enabah is the minister of Civil Aviation of Egypt. Manar was managing the Egyptair Training Academy before becoming the minister. Under his leadership, the Egyptair Training Academy qualified the International Civil Aviation Organization’s inspection test.

References 

Civil Aviation ministers of Egypt
Living people
Year of birth missing (living people)